A lunette (French lunette, "little moon") is a half-moon shaped architectural space, variously filled with sculpture, painted, glazed, filled with recessed masonry, or void. 
A lunette may also be segmental, and the arch may be an arc taken from an oval. 
A lunette window is commonly called a half-moon window, or fanlight when bars separating its panes fan out radially.

If a door is set within a round-headed arch, the space within the arch above the door, masonry or glass, is a lunette. If the door is a major access, and the lunette above is massive and deeply set, it may be called a tympanum.

A lunette is also formed when a horizontal cornice transects a round-headed arch at the level of the imposts, where the arch springs. If the top of the lunette itself is bordered by a hood mould it can also be considered a pediment.

The term is also employed to describe the section of interior wall between the curves of a vault and its springing line. A system of intersecting vaults produces lunettes on the wall surfaces above a cornice. The lunettes in the structure of the Sistine Chapel ceiling inspired Michelangelo to come up with inventive compositions for the spaces.

In the Neoclassical architecture of Robert Adam and his French contemporaries like Ange-Jacques Gabriel, a favorite scheme set a series of windows within shallow blind arches. The lunettes above lent themselves to radiating motifs: a sunburst of bellflower husks, radiating fluting, a low vase of flowers, etc.

Flemish painter Giusto Utens rendered a series of Medicean villas in lunette form for the third grand duke of Tuscany, Ferdinando I, in 1599–1602:

See also
 Fanlight

References

External links 

 Lunette on Encyclopaedia Britannica

Arches and vaults
Doors